Into the Wild: Live at EastWest Studios is a five-track live EP, released by American singer LP on April 24, 2012 through Warner Bros. Records.

Release
The EP was initially released as a CD/DVD and digital download. On April 20, 2013, a 12" vinyl version, featuring a bonus track "It's Over", was released for the 2013 Record Store Day in a number of 1850 copies.

Track listing

Charts

Release history

References

2012 debut EPs
LP (singer) albums
Warner Records EPs
Albums recorded at EastWest Studios